L'un n'empêche pas l'autre is the eighteenth album by experimental French singer Brigitte Fontaine, released in 2011 on the Polydor label. Like Kékéland in 2001, it's mostly an album featuring duets. There are only four originals, the other songs are new recordings of rarities and older songs.

Track listing

Brigitte Fontaine albums
2011 albums